Stanley Cheung King-shun (born 23 January 1981) is a Hong Kong actor, singer, and presenter. In 2003, Cheung debuted as a member of the short lived boy band Cheers, which won Hong Kong's Best New Artist at Shanghai's Asian Music Festival in 2003. In 2006, Cheung auditioned for TVbeople, a talent casting system hosted by TVB, and was selected to sign a two-year artiste contract with the company along with six other winners. Before acting in dramas, Cheung has hosted several entertainment programmes for TVB. Cheung is perhaps best known for his role as Ka-ming in the 2011 drama serial When Heaven Burns.

Filmography

Films

Television

References

External links

Stanley Cheung at TVB.com

1981 births
Living people
Hong Kong male film actors
Hong Kong male television actors
Hong Kong television presenters
TVB actors
21st-century Hong Kong male actors